Jyoti Gauba is an Indian television and film actress. She had done over 600 commercials till date and made her film debut with the film Idiot Box. She was also seen in the films like Take It Easy, Thoda Pyaar Thoda Magic.

She has featured in many television shows like Ek Hasina Thi, Kavach... Kaali Shaktiyon Se , Badii Devrani, Maat Pitaah Ke Charnon Mein Swarg, Agent Raghav – Crime Branch, Love Marriage Ya Arranged Marriage, Ek Mutthi Aasmaan, Kasam Tere Pyaar Ki, Hello Friends, Phir Subah Hogi and Mastaangi - One Love Story Two Lifetimes.

She was last seen as Supriya Vyas in Piyaa Albela. Currently, she is portraying the role of Anuja Chaturvedi in Star Plus's Imlie.

Filmography

Films

Television

Web series

References

External links

Indian women television presenters
Indian television presenters
Living people
Actresses in Hindi cinema
Indian film actresses
Indian television actresses
Indian soap opera actresses
1962 births